Gustav Per Fredrik Engvall (born 29 April 1996) is a Swedish professional footballer who plays as a forward for Belgian club Mechelen.

Career
Starting his career with Färjestadens GoIF, Engvall subsequently played for IFK Göteborg in the Allsvenskan.

In 2016, he signed for EFL Championship side Bristol City, and made his debut in a 2–1 win over Fulham in the EFL Cup on 21 September.

Engvall was loaned out to Djurgården in 2017 for an initial six month period, later extended until the end of the 2017 season.

He returned to IFK Göteborg on loan in March 2018.

On 29 June 2018 Engvall joined Mechelen on a two-year contract.

On 10 August 2022, Engvall moved on loan to Sarpsborg 08 in Norway until the end of 2022.

Career statistics

International

Honours
Mechelen
 Belgian Cup: 2018–19
Sweden U17
 FIFA U-17 World Cup Third place: 2013

References

External links

IFK Göteborg profile

1996 births
People from Kalmar
Sportspeople from Kalmar County
Living people
Swedish footballers
Association football forwards
Sweden youth international footballers
Sweden under-21 international footballers
Sweden international footballers
Färjestadens GoIF players
IFK Göteborg players
Bristol City F.C. players
Djurgårdens IF Fotboll players
K.V. Mechelen players
Sarpsborg 08 FF players
Allsvenskan players
English Football League players
Challenger Pro League players
Belgian Pro League players
Eliteserien players
Swedish expatriate footballers
Expatriate footballers in England
Swedish expatriate sportspeople in England
Expatriate footballers in Belgium
Swedish expatriate sportspeople in Belgium
Expatriate footballers in Norway
Swedish expatriate sportspeople in Norway